Heroic bloodshed is a genre invented by Hong Kong action cinema revolving around stylized action sequences and dramatic themes such as brotherhood, duty, honour, redemption and violence that has become a popular genre used by different directors worldwide. The term heroic bloodshed was coined by editor Rick Baker in the magazine Eastern Heroes in the late 1980s, specifically referring to the styles of directors John Woo and Ringo Lam. Baker defined the genre as "a Hong Kong action film that features a lot of gun play and gangsters rather than kung fu. Lots of blood. Lots of action." Heroic bloodshed films often feature gun fu action sequences.

Motifs

Protagonists in these films are often good-willed criminals, typically Triad members, hit men, or thieves with a strict code of ethics, which in some cases leads to the betrayal of their employers and the saving of many intended victims. The police officer with a conscience, who cannot be corrupted in any way, is also common, and is usually modeled after the hardboiled detective. Loyalty, family and brotherhood are the most typical themes of the genre. Heroic bloodshed films generally have a strong emotional angle, not only between, but during action sequences.

Pistols and submachine guns are frequently utilized by the heroes due to the light weight they provide, enabling their wielders to move more quickly. They are frequently dual wielded. The heroes are extremely agile and implement rolls, dives, slides, and falls while they duel, making for a graceful, ballet-like performance in the midst of gunfire.

Heroic bloodshed films often end on a downbeat or tragic note with the main heroes either dead, arrested by the police, or severely incapacitated.

History
John Woo's breakthrough film A Better Tomorrow (1986) largely set the template for the heroic bloodshed genre. In turn, A Better Tomorrow was a reimagining of plot elements from two earlier Hong Kong crime films: Lung Kong's The Story of a Discharged Prisoner (1967) and the Shaw Brothers Studio film The Brothers (1979), the latter a remake of the hit Indian crime drama film Deewaar (1975) written by Salim–Javed.

Woo has also been a major influence in its continued popularity and evolution in his following works, namely A Better Tomorrow 2 (1987), The Killer (1989) and Hard Boiled (1992).

The heroic bloodshed genre had a considerable impact on world cinema, especially Hollywood. The action, style, tropes and mannerisms established in 1980s Hong Kong heroic bloodshed films were later widely adopted by Hollywood in the 1990s, reshaping the way Hollywood action films were made. Lam's City on Fire (1987) inspired Quentin Tarantino's Reservoir Dogs (1992); Tarantino was an admirer of the heroic bloodshed genre. The Killer also heavily influenced Luc Besson's Léon: The Professional (1994). Eventually, John Woo himself introduced his brand of heroic bloodshed to Hollywood in the 1990s. By the late 1990s, Woo's style of cinema had become firmly established in Hollywood.

Selected heroic bloodshed films

The Brothers (1979)
The Head Hunter (1982)
Coolie Killer (1982)
On the Wrong Track (1983)
Scarface (1983)
Long Arm of the Law (1984)
Danger Has Two Faces (1985)
Hong Kong Godfather (1985)
A Better Tomorrow (1986)
Above the Law (1986)
Legacy of Rage (1986)
City on Fire (1987)
Rich and Famous (1987)
Tragic Hero (1987)
Sworn Brothers (1987)
Flaming Brothers (1987)
People's Hero (1987)
A Better Tomorrow II (1987)
Walk on Fire (1988)
Tiger Cage (1988)
The Dragon Family (1988)
The Big Heat (1988)
Hero of Tomorrow (1988)
Gunmen (1988)
City War (1988)
All About Ah-Long (1989)
Bloody Brotherhood (1989)
Runaway Blues (1989)
My Heart is That Eternal Rose (1989)
Close Escape (1989)
Wild Search (1989)
Casino Raiders (1989)
The Killer (1989)
Just Heroes (1989)
A Better Tomorrow III (1989)
China White (1989)
Return Engagement (1990)
Killer's Romance (1990)
Curry and Pepper (1990)
A Moment of Romance (1990)
Bullet in the Head (1990)
Gangland Odyssey (1990)
Dragon in Jail (1990)
Blood Stained Tradewinds (1990)
Once a Thief (1991)
Casino Raiders II (1991)
The Last Blood (1991)
Bullet for Hire (1991)
Hong Kong Godfather (1991)
Point Break (1991)
Hard Boiled (1992)
The Shootout (1992)
Dust of Angels (1992)
With or Without You (1992)
Gun n' Rose (1992)
Full Contact (1992)
A Moment of Romance II (1993)
First Shot (1993)
No More Love, No More Death (1993)
Crime Story (1993)
Hard Target (1993)
Story of Kennedy Town (1993)
Aatish: Feel the Fire (1994)
Rock N'Roll Cop (1994)
Léon: The Professional (1994)
Tian Di (1994)
A Taste of Killing and Romance (1994)
Revanchist (1994)
The True Hero (1994)
Man Wanted (1995)
Peace Hotel (1995)
Fallen Angels (1995)
The Adventurers (1995)
Somebody Up There Likes Me (1996)
Young and Dangerous (1996)
Broken Arrow (1996)
A Moment of Romance III (1996)
Shanghai Grand (1996)
Big Bullet (1996)
Beyond Hypothermia (1996)
Dang Bireley's and Young Gangsters (1997)
Face/Off (1997)
Full Alert (1997)
Postman Blues (1997)
Island of Greed (1997)
A True Mob Story (1998)
The Longest Nite (1998)
The Replacement Killers (1998)
Ballistic Kiss (1998)
Beast Cops (1998)
Expect the Unexpected (1998)
A Hero Never Dies (1998)
The Mission (1999)
Dead or Alive (1999)
Century of the Dragon (1999)
The Matrix (1999)
Double Tap (2000)
A War Named Desire (2000)
Dead or Alive 2: Birds (2000)
Mission: Impossible 2 (2000)
Born Wild (2001)
Fulltime Killer (2001)
Black Hawk Down (2001)
Dead or Alive: Final (2002)
Devil Face, Angel Heart (2002)
Infernal Affairs (2002)
PTU (2003)
Heroic Duo (2003)
Infernal Affairs II (2003)
Infernal Affairs III (2003)
Moving Targets (2004)
Jiang Hu (2004)
Explosive City (2004)
Divergence (2005)
Wo Hu (2005)
Dragon Squad (2005)
The City of Violence (2006)
Dog Bite Dog (2006)
On the Edge (2006)
The Departed (2006)
Exiled (2006)
Like a Dragon (2007)
Invisible Target (2007)
Blood Brothers (2007)
Brothers (2007)
Triangle (2007)
Hong Kong Bronx (2008)
Fatal Move (2008)
Chaos (2008)
Beast Stalker (2008)
The Sniper (2009)
Vengeance (2009)
A Better Tomorrow (2010)
Black Ransom (2010)
Monga (2010)
The Stool Pigeon (2010)
Let the Bullets Fly (2010)
The Raid: Redemption (2011)Drug War (2012)The Last Tycoon (2012)The Viral Factor (2012)The Gangster (2012)The White Storm (2013)That Demon Within (2014)John Wick (2014)The Raid 2 (2014)
Wild City (2015)
The Mobfathers (2016)
Trivisa (2016)
Extraordinary Mission (2017)
A Better Tomorrow 2018 (2018)

See also
 Cinema of Hong Kong
 Cinema of United States
 Crime film
 Gangster film
 Gun fu
 Girls with guns
 John Woo
 Johnnie To
 Mumbai underworld films, which have similarities to heroic bloodshed films.
 Ringo Lam
 War film

References

External links
 The Art of Heroic Bloodshed

Action films by genre
Cinema of the United States
Cinema of Hong Kong
Theatrical combat
Girls with guns films
1980s in film
1990s in film
2000s in film
2010s in film